Erika Uyterhoeven (born July 26, 1986) is a member of the Massachusetts House of Representatives for the 27th Middlesex district. Uyterhoeven is a member of the Democratic Party and the Democratic Socialists of America (DSA). Prior to serving in elected office, Uyterhoeven was a political activist and antitrust economist.

Early life and education 
Uyterhoeven was born on July 26, 1986 to a single mother born in Japan. Her mother was a union flight attendant, and has cited the rise of neoliberalism and the decline of the labor movement beginning in the 1980s as formative for her political development.

Uyterhoeven attended Wayland High School in Wayland, Massachusetts, graduating in 2004. She received her bachelor's degree from Wellesley College in 2010, and received a master’s degree from the University of Toulouse in 2014. In 2019, Uyterhoeven graduated with a master’s in business administration (MBA) from Harvard Business School.

Political career 
In 2020, Uyterhoeven ran to replace retiring incumbent Denise Provost as the member of the Massachusetts House of Representatives 27th Middlesex district. Running as a self-described democratic socialist, Uyterhoeven's successful campaign emphasized support for increased government transparency.

She previously organized with Momentum, a socialist organization in the United Kingdom. Uyterhoeven is a member of the Democratic Socialists of America (DSA).

Uyterhoeven is currently running for reelection in the 2022 election, and successfully won versus a primary challenger.

References

1986 births
21st-century American politicians
21st-century American women politicians
Living people
Democratic Party members of the Massachusetts House of Representatives
Democratic Socialists of America politicians from Massachusetts
Massachusetts socialists
People from Wayland, Massachusetts
Women state legislators in Massachusetts
American politicians of Japanese descent
American women of Japanese descent in politics
Wellesley College alumni
University of Toulouse alumni
Harvard Business School alumni